Another Man's Shoes is a 1922 American comedy film directed by Jack Conway and written by Victor Bridges, Raymond L. Schrock, and Arthur F. Statter. It is based on the 1913 novel Another Man's Shoes by Victor Bridges. The film stars Herbert Rawlinson, Barbara Bedford, Una Trevelyn, Nick De Ruiz, Josef Swickard, and Jean De Briac. The film was released on November 6, 1922, by Universal Film Manufacturing Company.

Cast          
Herbert Rawlinson as Stuart Granger / Jack Burton
Barbara Bedford as Mercia Solano
Una Trevelyn as Grace Burton
Nick De Ruiz as Ropal
Josef Swickard as Gouret
Jean De Briac as John Alvara
Harry Carter as Lawrence
Nelson McDowell as Milford
Lillian Langdon as Mrs. Chetwell
Jessie Deparnette as Duenna

References

External links

1922 films
1920s English-language films
Silent American comedy films
1922 comedy films
Universal Pictures films
Films directed by Jack Conway
Films based on British novels
American silent feature films
American black-and-white films
1920s American films